Georg Alexander Kornelius Erich von Rauch (1904–1991) was a Baltic German historian specializing in Russia and the Baltic states.

Rauch was born in Pskov, the son of Kornelius Anton Friedrich Wilhelm von Rauch, an officer in the Russian army. In 1911 the family moved to Sangaste in Governorate of Livonia. Rauch graduated from the University of Tartu with a degree in history in 1927, leaving for Germany in 1939. He joined the staff of the University of Marburg, where he taught Russian history, in 1946, becoming a professor in 1953. In 1958 he accepted an offer from the University of Kiel, where he became head of the Institute on East European History. His pioneering history of the Soviet Union was translated into other languages and became a standard textbook.

His son was the anarchist Georg von Rauch, killed by the police in 1971.

Works
 Geschichte des bolschewistischen Russland (Wiesbaden: Rheinische Verlags-Anstalt, 1955); tr. as A History of Soviet Russia (New York: Praeger, 1957; rev. edd. 1958, 1962, 1964, 1967, 1972).
 Die Geschichte der baltischen Staaten (München: Deutsche Taschenbuch Verlag, 1990); tr. as The Baltic States: The Years of Independence: Estonia, Latvia, Lithuania, 1917–1940 (New York: St. Martin's Press, 1995).

References

1904 births
1991 deaths
People from Pskov
People from Pskovsky Uyezd
Baltic-German people
Historians of Russia
20th-century German historians
German male non-fiction writers
University of Tartu alumni
Academic staff of the University of Marburg
Academic staff of the University of Kiel
German military personnel of World War II